Bogdanovsky rybopitomnik is a rural locality (a selo) in Nebylovskoye Rural Settlement, Yuryev-Polsky District, Vladimir Oblast, Russia. The population was 5 as of 2010.

Geography 
It is located on the Irmes River, 18 km north from Nebyloye, 43 km east from Yuryev-Polsky.

References 

Rural localities in Yuryev-Polsky District